Racing Club de France, also known as  RCF, is a French omnisport club that was founded on 20 April 1882 under the name Racing Club.

Racing Club changed its name to Racing Club de France (RCF) on 21 November 1885. The club is located at the Bois de Boulogne in Paris with club colours of white and blue.

Departments
The club offers the following sports:

 Athletics
 Badminton
 Basketball
 Decathlon
 Fencing
 Football
 Field hockey
 Golf
 Judo
 Pentathlon
 Rugby union
 Shooting
 Swimming
 Skiing
 Tennis
 Triathlon
 Volleyball (until 2009)

Basketball

Field hockey

Honours

Men
French champions: 22
 1899, 1903, 1909, 1926, 1929, 1930, 1943, 1960, 1961, 1979, 1983, 1985, 1990, 1991, 1992, 1993, 1994, 1995, 1996, 2015, 2016, 2017

Women
French champions: 13
 1923, 1924, 1926, 1930, 1932, 1933, 1935, 1936, 1955, 1956, 1957, 1966, 1972

Football

Rugby Union

Tennis
The clay courts of Racing Club have hosted two Women's Tennis Association tournaments, the Clarins Open between 1987 and 1992, and the Trophee Lagardère starting in 2022.

References

External links
 Official site
 Football
 Hockey
 Rugby du Racing Club de France

 
Multi-sport clubs in France
French field hockey clubs
Field hockey clubs established in 1897
Sports clubs in Paris